Wang Zeng ( 978 – 21 December 1038, courtesy name Xiaoxian) was a Song dynasty scholar-official who served as grand councilor during Emperor Renzong's early reign, first between 1022 and 1029, and later between 1035 and 1037.

Wang was widely respected for his honesty and fairness, and people even set up shrines with his portrait when he was alive. Politically, Wang was a major opponent of Ding Wei and held Empress Dowager Liu's imperial ambitions in check.

During Emperor Zhenzong's reign
Orphaned at a young age, Wang Zeng was raised by his paternal uncle. In Emperor Zhenzong's early reign, Wang Zeng scored first in the provincial examination, and first in the subsequent imperial examination. Wang's first assignment was in Ji Prefecture, not far from his hometown, where he served as prefectural supervisor. Returning to the national capital Kaifeng, Wang interviewed at the Institute of Academicians, where he impressed the grand councilor Kou Zhun, who recommended him to interview at the Administration Chamber. Wang was subsequently appointed concurrent posts in the Palace Library (as editorial director), Historiography Institute, and State Finance Commission (as an assistant).

During Emperor Renzong's reign

Notes and references

 

970s births
1038 deaths
People from Qingzhou
Song dynasty chancellors
Politicians from Weifang
Song dynasty politicians from Shandong